Greater Ankara refers to the immediate city and centre of the Ankara, Turkey and hence operates as a municipality and administrative area. It has a population of 2,715,000. It may be used in contrast to Outer Ankara.

Ankara